The grey-hooded flycatcher (Mionectes rufiventris) is a species of bird in the family Tyrannidae.

It is found in Argentina, Brazil, and Paraguay. Its natural habitats are subtropical or tropical moist lowland forest and subtropical or tropical moist montane forest.

References

grey-hooded flycatcher
Birds of the Atlantic Forest
grey-hooded flycatcher
Taxonomy articles created by Polbot